WYYZ (1490 AM) and (102.5 FM) is a radio station broadcasting a block format. Licensed to Jasper, Georgia, United States. The station is currently owned by Ava Stephens Rogers and Matthew Youngblood through licensee KARMA Media Group, LLC, and features programming ranging from Bluegrass and classic country along with southern gospel and classic rock.

References

External links

YYZ
Radio stations established in 1960
Country radio stations in the United States